National Route 19 is a national highway in South Korea connects Namhae County to Hongcheon County. It established on 31 August 1971.

Main stopovers
South Gyeongsang Province
 Namhae County - Hadong County
South Jeolla Province
 Gurye County
North Jeolla Province
 Namwon - Jangsu County - Muju County
North Chungcheong Province
 Yeongdong County - Okcheon County - Boeun County - Cheongju - Goesan County - Chungju
Gangwon Province
 Wonju - Hoengseong County - Hongcheon County

Major intersections

 (■): Motorway
IS: Intersection, IC: Interchange

South Gyeongsang Province

South Jeolla Province

North Jeolla Province

North Chungcheong Province

Gangwon Province

References

19
Roads in South Gyeongsang
Roads in North Jeolla
Roads in South Jeolla
Roads in North Chungcheong
Roads in Gangwon